Heriberto Correa Yepes (August 6, 1916 – September 9, 2010) was a Colombian Prelate of Roman Catholic Church. He was born in Cedeño, Colombia and was ordained a priest on November 12, 1939, from the religious order of Misioneros Javerianos de Yarumal. He was appointed as prefect to the Apostolic Vicariate of Mitú, Colombia on March 27, 1953, and he resigned sometime in 1967. He was appointed to Vicar Apostolic of Buenaventura Diocese (Colombia) along with Titular bishop of Casae Nigrae on January 29, 1973, and then ordained bishop on March 27, 1973. He retired as Vicar Apostolic on November 30, 1996.

External links
Catholic-Hierarchy

1916 births
2010 deaths
20th-century Roman Catholic bishops in Colombia
Roman Catholic bishops of Buenaventura